San Lorenzo Airport  is an airstrip serving San Lorenzo de Moxos, a village in the Beni Department of Bolivia. The runway is at the north end of the village.

See also

Transport in Bolivia
List of airports in Bolivia

References

External links 
 OpenStreetMap - San Lorenzo de Moxos
 Airport record for San Lorenzo Airport at Landings.com
 YouTube - San Lorenzo de Moxos takeoff

Airports in Beni Department